Dumbrăveni is a commune located in Suceava County, Romania. It is composed of two villages, Dumbrăveni and Sălăgeni.

Natives
 Mihai Guriță

References

Communes in Suceava County
Localities in Western Moldavia